This is a list of companies that produce bioplastics.  It may be incomplete.

 3fD
 AirCarbon
 Avantium
 An Phat Holdings
 BASF
 BioApply Polymers
 Biofibre
 Bioreset , Brazil
 Braskem
 Biofase
 BioSphere Plastic
 Cardia Bioplastics
 Ceres Media
 Purac
 Danimer Scientific
 DuPont
 Earthsoul , India
 FKuR Kunststoff
 Full Cycle Bioplastics
 Genecis
 Good Natured Products
 Green Dot Bioplastics
 Greengran
 Innovia Films
 Kaneka Corp, Japan
 Matrìca
 NatureWorks
 Novamont
Panara
 Pond Twelve, Denmark
 Rodenburg Biopolymers
 Showa Denko
 SK Chemical
 Solutions 4 Plastic
 Solvay
 TGBM - Tianjin GreenBio Materials
 Trellis Earth
 Trifilon
 Versalis (Eni)
 Verdastro, Malaysia